The Sapporo Kinen (Japanese 札幌記念) is a Grade 2 Handicap horse race for Thoroughbreds aged three and over run in August over a distance of 2,000 metres at Sapporo Racecourse.

It was first run in 1965 and was promoted to Grade 3 in 1984. The race was elevated to Grade 2 class in 1997. The race serves as a trial race for the autumn edition of the Tenno Sho.

Winners since 2000 

 The 2013 race took place at Hakodate Racecourse.

Earlier winners

 1984 - Roller King
 1985 - Rikisan Power
 1986 - Life Tateyama
 1987 - Foster Musashi
 1988 - Kobano Rich
 1989 - Dyna Letter
 1990 - Great Monte
 1991 - Mejiro Palmer
 1992 - Sanei Thank You
 1993 - Narita Chikara
 1994 - Hokuto Vega
 1995 - Super Play
 1996 - Marvelous Sunday
 1997 - Air Groove
 1998 - Air Groove
 1999 - Seiun Sky

See also
 Horse racing in Japan
 List of Japanese flat horse races

References

Turf races in Japan